The African Union Mission in Burundi (AMIB) was regional peacekeeping mission deployed by the African Union to Burundi in 2003 during the latter stages of the Burundian Civil War. The mission, consisting of 2,870 troops from South Africa, Mozambique and Ethiopia, remained in the country for one year, when it was replaced by the United Nations Operation in Burundi (ONUB) under the United Nations. The official transfer of authority from AMIB to ONUB took place on 1 June 2004. The South African component of the force remained and was formed into the African Union Special Task Force (AU STF).

References

African Union
Burundian Civil War
Military units and formations established in 2003
Peacekeeping missions and operations involving the African Union
Military history of South Africa
Military history of Mozambique
Military history of Ethiopia